The Party of the Radical Left (PRL) is a left-wing political party in Serbia. It was founded in September 2020 as the successor to Social Democratic Union. The party has no seats in the National Assembly, and is yet to contest the parliamentary election.

History

Party founding
The party was established in September 2020, although its establishment was announced in November 2019, and postponed several times, due to technical difficulties, but also ideological disagreements within the membership of the Social Democratic Union (SDU). Notable founders of the Party of the Radical Left include Ivan Zlatić, political activist and the last leader of the SDU and Jovo Bakić, recognized sociologist and a university professor. At the 12th regular Congress of the SDU, which had an electoral character, the party adopted the proposals for its new program and statute, changing the party's name to the Party of Radical Left. The twelfth Congress of the SDU represented the end of the process of uniting the various extra-parliamentary left-wing organizations gathered around the Social Democratic Union into a parliamentary struggle, which began with the invitation of the SDU in mid-2018. This process continued through joint actions of various Serbian leftist organizations and student initiatives from Belgrade and Novi Sad, against violent evictions, as well against the construction of mini-hydro power plants, during 2019 and 2020. At the September 2020 Congress, a new composition of party bodies was elected.

It voiced its support for the Roma Party in the 2022 general election.

Ideology 
A left-wing political party, PRL is supportive of democratic socialism and anti-capitalism. It has been also described as left-wing populist.

Program
PRL was founded as a political initiative of workers, trade unionists, unemployed and students in Serbia. Like its predecessor, it regarded itself as the moral and ideological heir of the historical left-wing Serbian Social Democratic Party of Dimitrije Tucović, as well of Yugoslav Anti-Fascist Resistance Movement. The new party announcing the struggle to build a just economic system, protection of human and labour rights and the existential security of every member of the society, as well making a socialist and secular republic, based on equality, solidarity, freedoms, democracy, internationalism, anti-imperialism, anti-nationalism and anti-fascism, in which people will be more important than profit, with guaranteed free health care and education, gender equality and minority rights. The party has been profiling itself as the most vocal opposition to the SNS-led regime in Serbia, which has been in power since 2012. Representatives of the party maintain cooperation with minor left-wing organizations and initiatives in Serbia, such as Marks21, as well as some leftist parties from the neighboring countries, including the New Left and the Workers' Front from Croatia and The Left from Slovenia, as well with the other European Left parties, GUE/NGL, Progressive International and Democracy in Europe Movement 2025 of Yanis Varoufakis.

Electoral performance

Parliamentary elections

Presidential elections

References

2020 establishments in Serbia
Democratic socialist parties in Europe
Political parties established in 2020
Left-wing parties in Serbia
Left-wing populism